Bresje (Ariljača) is a village in the Municipality of Kosovo Polje, in Kosovo.

Notes

References 

Villages in Kosovo Polje